The tithe is specifically mentioned in the Books of Leviticus, Numbers and Deuteronomy. The tithe system was organized in a seven-year cycle, the seventh-year corresponding to the Shemittah-cycle in which year tithes were broken-off, and in every third and sixth-year of this cycle the second tithe replaced with the poor man's tithe. These tithes were akin to taxes for the people of Israel and were mandatory, not optional giving. This tithe was distributed locally "within thy gates" to support the Levites and assist the poor. Every year, Bikkurim, terumah, ma'aser rishon and terumat ma'aser were separated from the grain, wine and oil. Initially, the commandment to separate tithes from one's produce only applied when the entire nation of Israel had settled in the Land of Israel. The Returnees from the Babylonian exile who had resettled the country were a Jewish minority, and who, although they were not obligated to tithe their produce, put themselves under a voluntary bind to do so, and which practice became obligatory upon all.

Terumah (Heave-offering)

The first obligation that was incumbent upon an Israelite or Jew was to separate from his harvested grain, such as wheat, barley, or spelt, wine (including unpressed grapes) and oil (including unpressed olives) the one-fiftieth portion of these products (or one-fortieth, if he were a man of generosity; and one-sixtieth if he were stingy) and to give the same to a Kohen, a priest of Aaron's lineage, who, in turn, would eat such fruits in a state of ritual cleanness, in accordance with a biblical command, "...and let him not eat of the holy things, until he bathes his flesh in water. And when the sun goes down, he will be clean, and shall afterward eat of the holy things because it is his food".

The tractate Terumot of the Mishnah and of the Jerusalem Talmud formulates the Jewish religious law for this gift, specifying two kinds of terumot given to the priest: the regular offering, known also as the terumah gedolah ("great heave-offering"), which the Israelites were required to give to the priest from the produce of their fields, and the terumat ma'aser ("tithe of the heave-offering"), the gift that the Levites were required to put aside for the priests from the tithe which ordinary Israelites had been required to give to them.

This obligation was contingent upon the fact that such fruits grew in the Land of Israel. Later, the Rabbis made it an obligation to do the same for all fruits and vegetables grown in the Land of Israel, and not only to such fruits as grain, grapes and olives.

After the destruction of the Temple and the cessation of ritual purity, the obligation to separate the terumah continued, although it was no longer given to a kohen, since the requirements for attaining ritual purity were no longer available. The general practice after the Temple's destruction was to separate the terumah from all fruits and vegetables by removing even a small amount, and to immediately discard it by burial or some other means of disposal (since it can no longer be eaten in the current state of ritual uncleanness, and those doing so would make themselves liable to extirpation).

First tithe

The first tithe is the gift of one tenth of the remaining agricultural produce to the Levite after removing from the produce for gift of terumah to the priests). Historically, during the First Temple period, the first tithe was given to the Levites.  Approximately at the beginning of the Second Temple construction, Ezra and his Beth din implemented giving it to the kohanim.

The Levites, also known as the Tribe of Levi, were descendants of Levi. They were assistants to the Aaronic priests (who were the children of Aaron and, therefore, a subset of the Tribe of Levi) and did not own or inherit a territorial patrimony. Their function in society was that of temple functionaries, teachers and trusted civil servants who supervised the weights and scales and witnessed agreements. The goods donated from the other Israelite tribes were their source of sustenance. They received from "all Israel" a tithe of food or livestock for support, and in turn would set aside a tenth portion of that tithe (known as the terumat hamaaser) for the  priests.

The tractate Ma'aserot of the Mishna and of the Jerusalem Talmud formulates the Jewish religious law for the types of produce liable for tithing, as well as the circumstances and timing under which produce becomes obligated for tithing during each of the six years of the tithing cycle.

Second tithe

Unlike other offerings which were restricted to consumption within the tabernacle, the second tithe could be consumed anywhere within the Walls of Jerusalem. On years one, two, four and five of the Shemittah-cycle, God commanded the Children of Israel to take a second tithe that was to be brought to the place of the Temple. The owner of the produce was to separate and bring 1/10 of his finished produce to the Old City of Jerusalem, after separating terumah and the first tithe, but if the family lived too far from Jerusalem, the tithe could be redeemed upon coins. Then, the Bible required the owner of the redeemed coins to spend the tithe "to buy whatever you like: cattle, sheep, wine or other fermented drink, or anything you wish". Implicit in the commandment was an obligation to spend the coins on items meant for human consumption.

Poor tithe

The poor tithe, or poor man's tithe, also referred to as the pauper's tithe or the third tithe, is a triennial tithe of one's produce, required in Jewish law. It requires that one tenth of produce grown in the third and sixth years of the seven-year sabbatical cycle be given to the Levites and the poor.<ref>Sirach, scrolls, and sages p185  ed. T. Muraoka, John F. Elwolde - 1999 "and honouring God was expressed, inter alia, by paying one's dues to the priesthood and by setting aside the 'pauper's tithe'"</ref>

The law applies during the days of the Temple in Jerusalem, and after the Temple's destruction. It applies only to crops that are harvested in the Land of Israel, but during the seventh year, also applies to crops harvested in Jordan and Egypt, so that the poor of Israel would be supported in the seventh year.

Terumat maaserTerumat hamaaser was given by the Levite to the Kohen, and was one-tenth of what the Levite had received of the first-tithe. It is alluded to in the Hebrew Bible under the words, "a tithe (tenth) of the tithe". It, too, was considered terumah, and was eaten by priests in a state of ritual cleanness. Today, the terumat maaser is discarded because of general uncleanness, just as the terumah is now discarded.

DemaiDemai is a halakhic term meaning "dubious," referring to agricultural produce, the owner of which was not trusted with regard to the correct separation of the tithes assigned to the Levites, although the terumah (the part designated to priests) was believed to have been separated from such fruits. In such "dubious" cases, all that was necessary was to separate the one-tenth portion due to the priests from the first tithe given to the Levites, being the 1/100 part of the whole. The second tithe is also removed (redeemed) from the fruit in such cases of doubt.

Places that require tithing
The criterion for determining what places require the tithing of produce is any place within the country that was held by the Returnees from the Babylonian exile, as defined in the "Baraita of the Boundaries" of the Land of Israel; although today the land might be held by a different entity, or else worked by non-Jews, produce grown in those places would still require the separation of tithes when they come into the hand of an Israelite or Jew.

Tithes are broken-off during the sabbatical year (such as when the ground lies fallow), during which year, all fruits, grains and vegetables that are grown of themselves in that year are considered free and ownerless property. For example, whatever lands were held by those returning from the Babylonian exile at the time of Ezra are forbidden to be ploughed and sown by any Jew during the seventh year, and even if gentiles were to plough such land and sow it, the produce would be forbidden unto Jews to eat. On the other hand, the extension of such lands held by the people of Israel who departed Egypt and who entered the Land of Canaan under their leader, Joshua, are forbidden to be ploughed by any Jew during the seventh year, but if gentiles had ploughed such land and sown it, the produce is permitted to be eaten by a Jew. If on a regular week-year, fruits and grains and vegetables, if grown by an Israelite in these places, would require tithing.

Cattle tithe

An additional tithe mentioned in the Book of Leviticus is the cattle tithe, which is to be sacrificed as a korban at the Temple in Jerusalem.

Ma'aser kesafimMa'aser kesafim'' is a tithe that Jews give to charity (tzedakah), something that is done on a voluntary basis, as this practice has not been regulated in Jewish codes of law.

References

 
Jewish sacrificial law
Jewish agrarian laws
Land of Israel laws in Judaism
Positive Mitzvoth
Twenty-four kohanic gifts